List of the most expensive stadiums in the world.

See also 
List of most expensive buildings

References

Expensive